Antirrhea philaretes is a butterfly of the family Nymphalidae. It was first described by C. & R. Felder in 1862. It is found in Honduras, Nicaragua, Costa Rica, Panama, Colombia, Ecuador, Peru and Brazil.

References 

Butterflies described in 1862
Morphinae
Fauna of Brazil
Nymphalidae of South America